Ryukyu Island legislative election, 1962. It was held in November that year.

Results

See also
Government of the Ryukyu Islands
1968 Ryukyu Islands legislative election

Sources
The Europa World Year Book, Volume II, p. 1000

1960s in Okinawa
Elections in Okinawa Prefecture
1962 in Japan
November 1962 events in Asia
Ryukyu Islands